Motobu Airfield is a World War II airfield on the Motobu Peninsula of Okinawa, near the East China Sea coast. The airfield was deactivated after 1945.

History

The airfield was built in April 1945 by the United States Army Corps of Engineers and United States Navy Seabees as a combat airfield to support the Army and Marine Corps ground forces during the Battle of Okinawa.  It had a 7,000' x 100' single runway and was used as the support field for Headquarters, Fifth Air Force and its subordinate commands on Okinawa from August through October 1945 until they moved to Honshu, Japan for postwar occupation duty.

Units assigned
 Headquarters, Fifth Air Force*, August 4 – September 25, 1945
 Headquarters, V Bomber Command*, August–October 1945
 Headquarters, V Fighter Command*, August–October 1945
 Headquarters, 308th Bombardment Wing*, June 16 – September 22, 1945

.* Assigned to nearby town of Hamasaki and used Motobu Airfield for air operations.

 Headquarters, 3d Bombardment Group, A-20 Havoc, August 6 – September 8, 1945
 8th Bombardment Squadron, August 7 – October 26, 1945
 13th Bombardment Squadron, August 7 – October 10, 1945
 89th Bombardment Squadron, August 6 – September 8, 1945
 90th Bombardment Squadron, August 6 – September 8, 1945

 Headquarters, 380th Bombardment Group, B-24 Liberator, August 9 – November 28, 1945
 528th Bombardment Squadron, August 8 – November 28, 1945
 529th Bombardment Squadron, August 18 – November 28, 1945
 530th Bombardment Squadron, August 10 – November 28, 1945
 531st Bombardment Squadron, August 15 – November 28, 1945

 Headquarters, 22d Bombardment Group, B-24 Liberator, August 15 – November 23, 1945
 2d Bombardment Squadron, August 18 – November 23, 1945
 19th Bombardment Squadron, August 14 – November 23, 1945
 33d Bombardment Squadron, August 15 – November 23, 1945
 408th Bombardment Squadron, August 21 – November 23, 1945

 Headquarters, 417th Bombardment Group, A-20 Havoc, August 17 – November 1, 1945
 672d Bombardment Squadron, August 17 – November 3, 1945
 673d Bombardment Squadron, August 18 – November 4, 1945
 674th Bombardment Squadron, August 15 – November 1, 1945
 675th Bombardment Squadron, August 17 – November 5, 1945

In addition to the Army units,  several Navy aviation squadrons used the airfield.   Its postwar use is undetermined.  Today, parts of the runway can still be seen on aerial photography.

See also
Naval Base Okinawa

References

 Maurer, Maurer (1983). Air Force Combat Units Of World War II. Maxwell AFB, Alabama: Office of Air Force History. .

Airfields of the United States Army Air Forces in Occupied Japan
Airfields in the Pacific theatre of World War II
Japan campaign
Defunct airports in Japan
Airports established in 1945
Airports disestablished in 1945
1945 establishments in Japan
1945 disestablishments in Japan
Closed installations of the United States Army